HMS Malta was the Spanish 10-gun schooner Malta, built and launched in the United States of America in 1797. The British captured her in 1800. After the Royal Navy captured the French ship-of-the-line Guillaume Tell and renamed her , the Admiralty renamed the schooner Gozo in December 1800 after the Maltese island of Gozo.

Malta was one of six British warships in sight on 8 January 1801 when  captured the French bombard St. Roche. She was carrying wine, liqueurs, ironware, Delfth (sic) cloth, and various other merchandise from Marseilles to Alexandria.

Then on 8 March the "Malta schooner", and the gun-vessel  protected the right flank during the landing of troops in Aboukir Bay.  protected the left flank, together with the cutter  and the gun-vessel .

Because Gozo served in the fleet under Admiral Lord Keith in the Egyptian campaign between 8 March and 2 September, she is listed amongst the vessels whose crews qualified for the NGSM with clasp "Egypt".

On 9 June Gozo (misspelled as Gogo) captured the chasse maree Trompeuse, which was sailing to Ancona.

Gozo was sold in 1804.

Notes, citations, and references
Notes

Citations

References
 

1797 ships
Captured ships
Schooners of the Royal Navy
Ships of the Spanish Navy
Ships built in the United States